Henderson is a home rule-class city along the Ohio River and is the county seat of Henderson County, Kentucky, United States. The population was 28,757 at the 2010 U.S. census. It is part of the Evansville Metropolitan Area, locally known as the "Tri-State Area". It is considered the southernmost suburb of Evansville, Indiana.

History

Early settlements

Archaeological research shows that people were living in what is now Kentucky by at least 9,500 BCE, although they may have arrived much earlier.

The settlers of the area after the start of the 1st millennium CE were of the Mississippian culture, a Native American civilization that flourished throughout what is now the Midwestern, Eastern, and Southeastern United States, from approximately 800 CE to 1600 CE. The population of most settlements of this culture had dispersed or were experiencing severe social and environmental stress by 1500.

The area that is now Henderson County was later inhabited by the Yuchi, Shawnee and the Eastern Band of Cherokee Indians. Significant artifacts from these tribes and earlier peoples, including from mounds, have been found by white settlers and their descendants since the 1700s.

18th century
Henderson has its roots in a small, block-wide strip of land high above the Ohio River, the site of the present-day Audubon Mill Park directly south of the city's riverfront boat dock. A village on this site was called "Red Banks" because of the reddish clay soil of the bluffs overlooking the Ohio River. The future city was named after Richard Henderson, an eighteenth-century pioneer and land speculator, by his associates Samuel Hopkins and Thomas Allin. Henderson County also shares this namesake. Known as the Transylvania Purchase, the sale was voided by the Virginia General Assembly, since the territory (and the sole right to purchase land from Indians within its bounds) was part of Virginia's royal charter. It was located at the confluence of the Green and Ohio rivers. Henderson hired Daniel Boone to survey the country and select favorable sites, but Henderson died before the town was developed.

By the early 1790s, Red Banks had a tavern and several European-American families co-existing with the local Cherokee. On November 16, 1792, resident Robert Simpson wrote to Alexander D. Orr in Lexington, requesting help to appoint a magistrate for Red Banks to deal with some of its 30 families he felt were of dubious (criminal) character. During this period, the Red Banks settlement had gained notoriety as a frontier haven for westward-moving outlaws and their families. One such family was that of Squire Samuel Mason. By that time, excluding the Cherokee, the free male inhabitants of Red Bank totaled 62. Later, in 1797, Captain Young of Mercer County, Kentucky and the "Exterminators", a group of regulators under his leadership swiftly and violently drove out the remaining outlaw element in Red Banks.

Samuel Hopkins and the surveyor Thomas Allin visited Red Banks in 1797 and laid out plans for the future town of Henderson. It was formally established by the Kentucky legislature the same year. A distinguishing characteristic of the new town plan was unusually wide streets, reportedly to prevent a fire in one block from easily spreading to another. Even with diagonal parking spaces outlined on downtown streets today, the streets are wide enough to include two-way traffic and space left over for delivery trucks to park in the center of the streets without interfering. By October 29, 1799, a census for the city of Henderson showed a population of 183. The county had 423 residents, 207 slaves, and 412 horses.

19th century

A post office was established in the town in 1801; the city was formally incorporated on January 21, 1840.

By mid-century, Henderson County had become a major producer of tobacco, much of which was exported to Great Britain. The area was reported to be the largest dark tobacco producer in the world; large tobacco warehouses and stemmeries dotted the downtown Henderson area. Postcards from the era show long lines of horse- and mule-drawn wagons piled high with tobacco, waiting their turn to unload for shipment downriver. Some tobacco processors accumulated considerable fortunes.

20th century
Shortly before World War I, Henderson was said to have more millionaires per capita than any other city in the world. Great Britain, however, imposed a high tariff on imported tobacco after the war, wrecking the county and city's export market. Tobacco warehouses and plants closed, and the community's economic fortunes reversed. The last tobacco facility, the Soaper Tobacco Warehouse on Pennell Street, closed in 1984.

Henderson continued as a regional center into the 20th century. Businesses were concentrated in the downtown area. In the early 20th century, recognizable neighborhoods (unincorporated places) within the city and the outlying edges of town included Audubon, Weaverton, and Audubon Heights. Segments of Audubon and Weaverton were sometimes referred to as the "East End", which held the second-largest business area after downtown Henderson.

21st century
A workplace shooting occurred at an Atlantis Plastics factory in Henderson on June 25, 2008. The gunman, 25-year-old Wesley Neal Higdon, shot and killed five people and critically injured a sixth person before taking his own life. The shooting is the worst in the history of Henderson County in terms of casualties, surpassing triple homicides occurring in 1799 and 1955.

Geography
As the state line tends to follow the Indiana side of the river, most of the Ohio River going past Henderson is within the city limits.

Both the Bi-State Vietnam Gold Star Bridges and the Ellis Park Race Course horse racing track are located entirely within Kentucky. The racetrack uses Indiana's 812 area code despite officially being located in Kentucky.

Natural disasters
Henderson had unusual weather patterns in the late 1800s and early 1900s. The "great sleet" of 1901 fell for three weeks in February. "Horses had to have special shoes to keep their footing on local roads."

In 1908 the Henderson area had high temperatures and a drought, which markedly reduced the flow of the Ohio River. The Henderson Daily Gleaner reported that "boys were playing baseball every day in the middle of the old riverbed." All businesses were challenged and forced to close. A Henderson reporter wrote, "[I]t is almost hazardous for even small gasoline boats to run".

On June 20, 1914, Henderson was hit by a "baby cyclone". Jack Hudgions, local historian and newsman, wrote that "hail as large as partridge eggs" fell for ten minutes and that powerful winds uprooted giant trees "and twisted limbs from shade trees in the city." In the northern part of Henderson, several buildings were blown down and wheat stocks were scattered. The storm lasted for more than 30 minutes, laying crops low throughout the county. Telephone lines were damaged and windows broken in the city and county by the hailstones. 26 days later, the city was hit by a tornado that left two dead and much of the city in ruins.

In 1937,  of precipitation fell in 18 days over the Ohio River watershed, resulting in the Ohio River flood of 1937 and extensive damage. Henderson, on its bluff, was spared much of the damage that Pittsburgh, Cincinnati, Louisville, Evansville, Paducah and other river cities suffered. Leigh Harris, the publisher of the Henderson Gleaner and Evening Journal newspapers, wrote, "Henderson is on the river but never in it!" Its favorable location helped the city attract new industries.

Climate
The climate in this area is characterized by hot, humid summers and generally mild to cool winters.  According to the Köppen Climate Classification system, Henderson has a humid subtropical climate, abbreviated "Cfa" on climate maps.

Demographics

As of the census of 2000, there were 27,373 people, 11,693 households, and 7,389 families residing in the city. The racial makeup of the city was 84.1% White, 11.8% Black or African American, 0.18% Native American, 0.7% Asian, 0.01% Pacific Islander, 0.58% from other races, and 1.04% from two or more races. Hispanics or Latinos of any race were 1.27% of the population.

There were 11,693 households, out of which 29.8% had children under the age of 18 living with them, 45.5% were married couples living together, 14.1% had a female householder with no husband present, and 36.8% were non-families. 32.1% of all households were made up of individuals, and 12.9% had someone living alone who was 65 years of age or older. The average household size was 2.27 and the average family size was 2.86.

The age distribution was 23.5% under the age of 18, 9.2% from 18 to 24, 29.5% from 25 to 44, 22.5% from 45 to 64, and 15.3% who were 65 years of age or older. The median age was 37 years. For every 100 females, there were 89.3 males. For every 100 females age 18 and over, there were 85.3 males.

The median income for a household in the city was $30,427, and the median income for a family was $39,887. Males had a median income of $32,131 versus $22,225 for females. The per capita income for the city was $17,925. About 13.2% of families and 16.5% of the population were below the poverty line, including 24.6% of those under age 18 and 11.3% of those age 65 or over.

Economy
The county has numerous industries, including aluminum production, automotive and appliance parts, plastic injection molding, tool and die making, food processing and processing of recycled materials. In June 2008, of the 20,205 jobs in Henderson, almost 12% were government jobs. It also ranks as one of Kentucky's top three corn and soybean producers. Henderson County is also one of the state's leading coal producers, with over 2.8 million tons produced in 2004.

Arts and culture

Annual festivals
Each year Henderson hosts a variety of events and festivals. The Henderson Breakfast Lions Club holds the Tri-Fest, a street festival that raises funds for non-profit organizations, in mid-April each year. There is also the free Handy Blues and Barbecue Festival in mid-June and the Bluegrass in the Park Folklife Festival in August. Annual barbecues have been a Henderson tradition dating as far back as the one started on Sunday, July 18, 1926 in Atkinson Park by the Henderson Freight Station employees. Notable foods were lamb, burgoo, etc.

Bluegrass in the Park Folklife Festival is one of the largest free Bluegrass festivals in the country.  It is Henderson's oldest on-going music festival and marked its 25th continuous year in 2010.  Past performers have included Bill Monroe, Emmylou Harris, Alison Krauss and Union Station, Ricky Skaggs, John Hartford, Glen Campbell, and other notable Bluegrass artists.  The Folklife aspect of the festival is a celebration of local lifestyles and culture with displays on recreational folklife (traditional games), functional folklife (quilting, tatting, chair-caning, basket-making, fly-tying), oral traditions (storytelling), folk music, food traditions (curing country hams, making burgoo, the craft of barbecue), and foreign cultures that have integrated with local traditions, among other things.

The Green River Arts and Crafts Festival is a large event that has been held for more than 30 years on a weekend in early October at John James Audubon State Park and organized by the Green River Area Development District.

Points of interest

John James Audubon State Park. — John James Audubon spent several years in Henderson in the 1810s. He had a store with his partner Ferdinand Rozier before deciding to work at art full-time. He is honored in the downtown with nine cast-bronze sculptures based on paintings from his Birds of America series, at the Park's museum.  It houses the world's largest collection of Audubon memorabilia and a collections of his work.
River Front — The city's downtown and river front features a play area and water park, trails and benches, and boat docks.
Metzger's Tavern is the oldest continuously operating tavern in Kentucky, founded in 1887.

Education
The Henderson County school system includes eight elementary schools: A.B. Chandler, Spottsville, East Heights, Bend Gate, South Heights, Jefferson, Cairo, and Niagara; two middle schools, North Middle and South Middle; and one high school, Henderson County High School. The Thelma B. Johnson Early Learning Center serves pre-schoolers, and there is an alternative school for those suspended from the other schools in the district, Central Academy. There is one parochial school, Holy Name of Jesus Catholic School. and also a school for students with mental and/or physical deficiencies, Riverview School.

Henderson is home to one postsecondary institution, Henderson Community College, as well as a satellite campus of Murray State University. In addition, students are served by Oakland City University Evansville Center, the University of Evansville, and the University of Southern Indiana in Evansville.

Henderson has a lending library, the Henderson County Public Library.

Media
Henderson is served by one local daily newspaper, The Gleaner, as well as the metro edition of the Evansville Courier & Press.

Henderson is part of the Evansville media market, the 101st-largest television market and 161st-largest radio market in the United States.  WSON (860-AM) is the only locally owned radio station broadcasting from the city.

Infrastructure

Transportation
The Henderson Area Rapid Transit (HART) was created in 1957 as a publicly owned mass transit system, of which all citizens who live in the city of Henderson are part owners.

 in Kentucky has its northern terminus at the US 41/US 60 interchange, but will be extended to Indiana via the Interstate 69 Ohio River Bridge.
's Bi-State Vietnam Gold Star Bridges connects the city with Evansville to the north and, to the south, the cities of Madisonville and Hopkinsville.

Notable people

Art and culture
Young Ewing Allison, writer, editor and publisher
John J. Becker, composer
Ingram Crockett, poet and journalist
Teddy Darby, blues musician
Ewing Galloway, journalist and county prosecutor 
Joey Goebel, author
Gregg Hale, film producer, Blair Witch Project
W.C. Handy, African-American blues legend, (spent about a decade in Henderson)
Rosa Henderson, American jazz and blues singer
Kristen Johnson, former Miss Kentucky USA
Grandpa Jones, Louis Marshall "Grandpa" Jones, banjo player, comedian, born in Henderson County

Military
Adam Johnson, Confederate brigadier general in the Civil War
Rear Admiral Husband E. Kimmel, commander of the U.S. Pacific Fleet during the Japanese attack on Pearl Harbor
Command Sergeant Major Gary L. Littrell, Medal of Honor recipient for his service during the Vietnam War
Corporal Luther Skaggs, Jr., Medal of Honor recipient for his service with the Marine Corps in the Pacific Theater of WWII

Business
Amos G. Rhodes, Atlanta furniture magnate and namesake of Rhodes Hall
Don Ball, philanthropist, businessman, and founder of Ball Homes.

Government and politics
John Young Brown, U.S. congressman, governor of Kentucky
Albert Benjamin "Happy" Chandler, U.S. senator, governor of Kentucky, commissioner of Major League Baseball
James Franklin Clay, U.S. congressman
John Lloyd Dorsey, Jr., U.S. congressman
Samuel Mason, early settler, justice of the peace, soldier, and river pirate
Carl D. Melton, Kentucky state representative and judge
Lazarus W. Powell, former governor of Kentucky
Ann Rutledge, first love of Abraham Lincoln; was born just outside Henderson
Augustus O. Stanley, Governor of Kentucky

Science and research
John James Audubon, ornithologist (spent several years in Henderson in the 1810s)
Darrell A. Posey, anthropologist, ethnobiologist

Sports
Clarence Adams, pro boxer
Sam Ball, former NFL player
Stephen Bardo, former NBA player
Junius Bibbs, winner of three Negro leagues championships as a member of the Kansas City Monarchs, born in Henderson
Christian Jolly, North American contract bridge champion

See also
Bi-State Vietnam Gold Star Bridges
Cities and towns along the Ohio River
John James Audubon State Park and Museum
Southern Cherokee Nation of Kentucky

References

Further reading

Workers of the Writer’s Project of the Works Projects Administration in the State of Kentucky (1941).  Henderson: A Guide to Audubon’s Home Town In Kentucky

External links

City of Henderson official website

   

Cities in Kentucky
Cities in Henderson County, Kentucky
County seats in Kentucky
Evansville metropolitan area
Coal towns in Kentucky
Kentucky populated places on the Ohio River